This is a list of episodes from the third season of Impractical Jokers.

Episodes

References

External links 
 Official website
 

Impractical Jokers
2014 American television seasons